"Treaty" is a protest song by Australian musical group Yothu Yindi, which is made up of Aboriginal and balanda (non-Aboriginal) members. Released in June 1991,  "Treaty" was the first song by a predominantly Aboriginal band to chart in Australia and was the first song partly in any Aboriginal Australian language to gain extensive international recognition, peaking at No. 6 on the Billboard Hot Dance Club Play singles charts. The song contains lyrics in Gumatj, one of the Yolngu Matha dialects and a language of the Yolngu people of Arnhem Land in northern Australia.

The song was released three years after the presentation of the Barunga Statement to then-Prime Minister Bob Hawke. Brothers Mandawauy and Galarrwuy Yunupingu wanted to highlight the lack of progress on the treaty between Indigenous Australians and the Australian government.

"Treaty" peaked at No. 11 on the ARIA Singles Chart in September 1991. In May 2001 "Treaty" was selected by the Australasian Performing Right Association (APRA) as one of the Top 30 Australian songs of all time. In 2009 "Treaty" was added to the National Film and Sound Archive's Sounds of Australia registry. In January 2018, as part of Triple M's "Ozzest 100", the "most Australian songs of all time", the Filthy Lucre version of "Treaty" was ranked number 10.

Background
In 1988, as part of Bicentennial celebrations,  the Prime Minister of Australia, Bob Hawke, visited the Northern Territory for the Barunga Festival, where he was presented with a statement of Aboriginal political objectives by Galarrwuy Yunupingu and Wenten Rubuntja, known as the Barunga Statement. Hawke responded to the Barunga Statement with a promise that a treaty would be concluded with Indigenous Australians by 1990.

In 1991, Yothu Yindi were Hughie Benjamin on drums, Sophie Garrkali and Julie Gungunbuy as dancers, Stuart Kellaway on bass guitar, Witiyana Marika on manikay (traditional vocals), bilma (ironwood clapsticks) and dance, Milkayngu Mununggurr on yidaki (didgeridoo), Gurrumul Yunupingu on keyboards, guitar and percussion, Makuma Yunupingu on yidaki, vocals, bilma, Mandawuy Yunupingu on vocals and guitar, Mangatjay Yunupingu as a dancer. Mandawuy Yunupingu, with his older brother Galarrwuy, wanted a song to highlight the lack of progress on the treaty between Aboriginal peoples and the federal government. Mandawuy Yunupingu recalls:

Production and release
"Treaty" was written by Australian musician Paul Kelly and Yothu Yindi members Mandawuy Yunupingu, Kellaway, Williams, Gurrumul Yunupingu, Mununggurr and Marika and Peter Garrett. The initial June 1991 release received limited radio and television exposure (mainly on ABC radio and SBS television).

Reception
After the initial release of the song failed to chart, Melbourne-based DJ Gavin Campbell (Razor Records), approached Mushroom Records to create a dance-oriented remix. The Filthy Lucre production team, consisting of Campbell, Paul Main and Robert Goodge produced a remix without the band's involvement but with the understanding that the Yolngu side of the music would be preserved. The remix not only modified the musical backing but dispensed with the majority of the English language lyrics, with the song sung almost entirely in the Aboriginal language, Gumatj. The Filthy Lucre remix was released in June, entering the charts in July and peaking at No. 11 on the Australian Recording Industry Association (ARIA) singles charts by September, spending a total of 22 weeks in the national charts.

"Treaty" was the first song by a predominantly Aboriginal band to chart in Australia.

Success for the single was transferred to the related album Tribal Voice which peaked at No. 4 on the ARIA Albums Chart. The album produced by Mark Moffatt for Mushroom Records was released in September 1991. Mandawuy Yunupingu took leave of absence from his duties as principal to tour and promote the single and album. 

"Treaty" peaked at No. 11 on the ARIA Singles Chart in September 1991.

In May 2001 "Treaty" was selected by the Australasian Performing Right Association (APRA) as one of the Top 30 Australian songs of all time.

In 2009 "Treaty" was added to the National Film and Sound Archive's Sounds of Australia registry.

In January 2018, as part of Triple M's "Ozzest 100", the "most Australian songs of all time", the Filthy Lucre version of "Treaty" was ranked number 10.

Awards
At the APRA Music Awards of 1991, "Treaty" won song of the Year.

At the 1992 ARIA Awards Yothu Yindi won awards for 'Engineer of the Year' for "Maralitja" (maralitja is Yolngu matha for crocodile man - one of Mandawuy Yunupingu's tribal names), "Dharpa" (dharpa is tree), "Treaty", "Treaty (Filthy Lucre remix)" and "Tribal Voice" by David Price, Ted Howard, Greg Henderson and Simon Polinski; 'Song of the Year' for "Treaty"; and "Single of the Year" for "Treaty".

In May 2001 "Treaty" was selected by Australasian Performing Right Association (APRA) as one of the Top 30 Australian songs of all time.

Musical style

Musically the song is a mixture of Yolngu and balanda styles. The timbres of the song include the balanda rock ensemble of electric guitars, keyboard and drumkit, and on occasion balanda voices.  The Yolngu sounds include the lead singer's vocal quality, and the traditional instruments, bilma (ironwood clapsticks) and yidaki.  The song's text is partly in English and partly in Gamatj, and the form of the song, while conforming to the balanda rock structure of verses and choruses with an instrumental break, and the process of intensity through repetition of short motifs, is nevertherless that of a djatpangarri, a form of Yolngu popular music.

Mandawuy Yunupingu recalled hearing the djantpangarri / djedbangari song "Storm" which originates from Yirrkala in the Northern Territory. He incorporated the beat into the musical composition.

Videos
There were two video clips for "Treaty". The first features footage of the 1988 Barunga Festival where the Barunga Statement is shown in its final stages of preparation, and Prime Minister Hawke is shown participating didjeridu-playing and spear-throwing competitions. As the Barunga Statement is presented to the Prime Minister, he is accompanied by the Minister for Indigenous Affairs, Gerry Hand. Also included in this first clip are images of the band in concert, and footage from the Gove Peninsula of industrial bauxite mining, ceremonial dancing led by Witiyana in the bush and children dancing on the beach.  According to the director, Stephen Johnson, it was never his intention to make a consciously "political" video.

A second clip for "Treaty" was made to accompany the Filthy Lucre remix. It was also directed by Stephen Johnson and dispenses with the overtly political shots of the previous video.  The video features images of the band in concert as well as footage from the Gove Peninsula of ceremonial dancing led by Witiyana in the bush, Witiyana and Milkayngu dancing with their instruments on the beach, Mandawuy Yunupingu singing over a blazing fire and children dancing on the beach with portable stereo given to them by Mandawuy Yunupingu.

Track listing

Yothu Yindi original version
 "Treaty" (Paul Kelly, Mandawuy Yunupingu, Stuart Kellaway, Cal Williams, Geoffrey Gurrumul Yunupingu, Milkayngu Mununggurr and Witiyana Marika) – 3:35
 "Yolngu Boy" (Mandawuy Yunupingu) – 4:14

Filthy Lucre remix version
Australian 12"/CD/Cassette
 "Treaty" (Filthy Lucre Remix) – 6:52
 "Treaty" (Radio Mix) – 4:08
 "Treaty" (Dub) – 7:30

US CD single
 "Treaty" (Filthy Lucre Radio Edit) - 4:05
 "Treaty" (Filthy Lucre Remix) - 6:53
 "Treaty" (Djulpan/Seven Sisters Mix) - 5:50 (William Orbit remix)
 "Treaty" (Album Version) - 3:36

US 12"
 "Treaty" (Djulpan/Seven Sisters Mix) - 5:46
 "Treaty" (VCO Buzz Mix) - 5:25
 "Treaty" (A Cappella) - 0:25
 "Treaty" (Filthy Lucre Mix) - 6:55
 "Treaty" (Filthy Lucre Dub) - 7:27

Personnel

Production details
Engineer – David Price, Ted Howard, Greg Henderson, Simon Polinski
Producer – Mark Moffatt
Remixers – Robert Goodge, Gavin Campbell, Paul Main (Filthy Lucre version)

Charts

Weekly charts

Year-end charts

Certifications

References

External links
  
  
 Treaty (1991) Australian Screen. 
 Aaron Corn (2009) Reflections & voices: exploring the music of Yothu Yindi with Mandawuy Yunupingu Sydney: Sydney University Press
 Castles, J. (1992) Tjungaringanyi: 'Aboriginal Rock Hayward, Philip (ed) From Pop to Punk to Postmodernism Sydney: Allen and Unwin

1991 singles
APRA Award winners
ARIA Award-winning songs
Yothu Yindi songs
Songs about Australia
Songs against racism and xenophobia
Mushroom Records singles
Yolngu-language songs